Jack Hill (September 12, 1887 – November 22, 1963) was an American actor, who appeared in scores of Laurel & Hardy comedies.

Selected filmography

 A Quiet Street (1922, Short) - Red Mike (uncredited)
 Back Stage (1923, Short) - Audience member
 Dogs of War (1923, Short) - Officer
 Stage Fright (1923, Short) - Audience member
 The Fighting Demon (1925) - Professor
 Good Cheer (1926, Short) - Pedestrian
 45 Minutes from Hollywood (1926, Short) - Hotel Guest (uncredited)
 The Glorious Fourth (1927, Short) - Man with monocle
 Sugar Daddies (1927, Short) - Hotel Extra #1
 Putting Pants on Philip (1927, Short)
 The Battle of the Century (1927, Short) - Ringside Spectator (uncredited)
 Playin' Hookey (1928, Short) - Keystone-ish cop
 Leave 'Em Laughing (1928, Short) - Irate Motorist (uncredited)
 Speedy (1928) - Minor Role (uncredited)
 Their Purple Moment (1928, Short) - Doorman / Pink Pub Patron (uncredited)
 Should Married Men Go Home? (1928, Short) - Muddy Combatant (uncredited)
 Two Tars (1928, Short) - Motorist with Mattress
 Election Day (1929, Short) - Gangster
 Liberty (1929, Short) - Officer
 Wrong Again (1929, Short) - Man on Buckboard
 Movie Night (1929, Short) - Movie Patron (uncredited)
 Railroadin' (1929, Short) - Grocery Truck Driver (uncredited)
 Leaping Love (1929, Short) - Minor Role (uncredited)
 Cat, Dog & Co. (1929, Short) - Pedestrian (uncredited)
 Blotto (1930, Short) - Man in Rainbow Club (uncredited)
 Le joueur de golf (1930) - (uncredited)
 La Vida nocturna (1930, Short) - Minor Role (uncredited)
 Below Zero (1930, Short) - Busboy (uncredited)
 Une nuit extravagante (1930, Short)
 Pups Is Pups (1930, Short) - Man in Crowd (uncredited)
 Be Big! (1931, Short) - Railway Station Passerby (uncredited)
 The Stolen Jools (1931, Short) - Policeman
 Pardon Us (1931) - Insurgent Convict (uncredited)
 Shiver My Timbers (1931, Short) - Pirate
 Beau Hunks (1931, Short) - Riffian (uncredited)
 The Kick-Off! (1931, Short) - Minor Role (uncredited)
 On the Loose (1931, Short) - Fun House Worker (uncredited)
 Any Old Port! (1932, Short) - Spectator (uncredited)
 The Chimp (1932, Short) - Circus Audience Member (uncredited)
 Pack Up Your Troubles (1932) - New Recruit / Pedestrian (uncredited)
 Free Wheeling (1932, Short) - Police Officer
 A Lad an' a Lamp (1932, Short) - Audience Member / Officer
 The Devil's Brother (1933) - Brigand (uncredited)
 Busy Bodies (1933, Short) - Shop Worker (uncredited)
 Elmer Steps Out (1934, Short)
 Fishing for Trouble (1934, Short)
 Back to the Soil (1934, Short)
 Treasure Island (1934) - Pirate (uncredited)
 Babes in Toyland (1934) - Townsman (uncredited)
 The Chases of Pimple Street (1934, Short) - Chase's Double (uncredited)
 Tit for Tat (1935, Short) - Passerby (uncredited)
 The Fixer Uppers (1935, Short) - Policeman (uncredited)
 Southern Exposure (1935, Short) - Juryman (uncredited)
 Stolen Harmony (1935) - Cop (uncredited)
 Bonnie Scotland (1935) - Hotel Lobby Guest / Newly Drafted Soldier / Native Henchman (uncredited)
 Millions in the Air (1935) - Motor Cop (uncredited)
 Divot Diggers (1936, Short) - Golfer
 The Bohemian Girl (1936) - Soldier (uncredited)
 The Lucky Corner (1936, Short) - Crowd extra
 On the Wrong Trek (1936, Short) - Bit Part (uncredited)
 Our Relations (1936) - Pirate's Club Customer (uncredited)
 General Spanky (1936) - Minor Role (uncredited)
 Way Out West (1937) - Finn's Employee (uncredited)
 Pick a Star (1937) - Minor Role (uncredited)
 Swiss Miss (1938) - Townsman (uncredited)
 Block-Heads (1938) - Soldier in Trenches (uncredited)
 Topper Takes a Trip (1938) - Policeman in Bank (uncredited)
 Mooching Through Georgia (1939, Short) - Union Officer (uncredited)
 Saps at Sea (1940) - Man Beneath Auto (uncredited)
 Land of the Lawless (1947) - Barfly (uncredited)
 Backfire (1950) - Cop at Shootout (uncredited) (final film role)

External links
 

1880s births
1963 deaths
American male film actors
Hal Roach Studios actors
20th-century American male actors
Place of birth missing
Place of death missing